Kurentovanje is Slovenia's most popular and ethnologically significant carnival event first organised in 1960 by Drago Hasl. This 11-day rite of spring and fertility highlight event is celebrated on Shrove Sunday in Ptuj, the oldest documented city in the region, and draws around 100,000 participants in total each year. In 2016 proclaimed as the 7th greatest carnival in the world by Lonely Planet.

Its main figure, known as Kurent or Korent, has been popularly (but incorrectly) reinterpreted as an extravagant god of unrestrained pleasure and hedonism in early Slavic customs. In today's festival, groups of kurents or kurenti wear traditional sheepskin garments while holding wooden clubs with hedgehog skins attached called ježevke, the noise of which is believed to "chase away winter". In this way, the presence of kurenti announces the end of winter and beginning of spring. Being a kurent was at first a privilege offered only to unmarried men, but today, married men, children and women are also invited to wear the outfit.

In 2010, the 50th anniversary of the first organized instance of this festival was celebrated. As the host of the festival, the town of Ptuj was admitted into the European Federation of Carnival Cities in 1991.

In 2017 Door-to-door rounds of Kurents was inscribed on the UNESCO Representative List of the Intangible Cultural Heritage of Humanity.

The first "modern" version of the Kurentovanje festival

On Shrove Sunday, 27 February 1960, the first modern version of the festival, called Kurentovanje, was organized in Ptuj, featuring traditional carnival costumes from Markovci. Carnival participants lined up in a procession. The procession leaders were spearmen followed by ploughmen, "rusa" (a bear), fairies, cockerels, and Kurents, all dancing to the sound of music played by a local band. The performance and customs of each traditional costume were explained to the gathered crowd via loudspeakers. The event met with tremendous success and aroused general interest which encouraged the organizers to continue.

One year later, the Markovci costumes were joined by ploughmen from Lancova Vas, log-haulers from Cirkovci, and mourners from Hajdina. For the first time, carnival (non-ethnographic) groups presented themselves in the afternoon. In 1962 the event reached beyond local boundaries by inviting other carnival figures such as lavfarji (< Bavarian German Laufer 'runner') from Cerkno and borovo gostuvanje (literally, "pine wedding participants") from Predanovci in the Prekmurje region.

Internationalization
The international aspect of the event was acquired in the following years when local and Slovene traditional costumes were joined by costumes from: Croatia, Serbia, North Macedonia, Hungary, Austria, Italy, Japan and many other countries. The number of participants and spectators grew over the years, with thousands visiting the Carnival events to marvel at the spectacular costumes and take part in the fun.

For many years, the main part of the event had been the presentation of individual traditional carnival groups. This took place either on the Saturday or Sunday morning prior to the afternoon procession.

Extending the festival's program
In 1994, the festival's program was extended to more than two days, featuring a multitude of events, performances in the square in front of the city hall, the burial of the Carnival, and an entertainment program in the carnival tent. From 1999 on, the Prince of the Carnival event was introduced with the enthronement of the Prince that takes place on 11 November (St. Martin's Day). This has become an important cultural and entertaining event in itself.

During the past few years, the carnival has begun precisely at midnight on 2 February—Candlemas. Budina, one of the mostly rural suburbs of Ptuj, stages the event. This event includes a huge bonfire around which, at the stroke of midnight, Kurents—for this event equipped relatively simply with a chain and five bells and a wooden club—start to dance, thus announcing the beginning of carnival. From this moment on Kurents are "allowed" to make their habitual rounds.

Nowadays the festival lasts for approximately eleven days, starting on Saturday, a week before Shrove Sunday, when only traditional carnival costumes form a procession on the streets of Ptuj and when the Prince of the Carnival is bestowed the honour of ruling the town during the carnival period. Each day features performances by individuals in costumes and many other types of entertainment which take place on the square in front of the town hall and in the carnival tent.

Activities culminate with Saturday's procession of traditional carnival costumes, the children's carnival parade, the burial of Carnival and the return of power to the mayor of the town. However, because there are sometimes fewer days between Candlemas and Shrove Tuesday, other activities are of shorter duration as well. Consequently, this strongly influences the entire program and development of the event each year.

Indigenous characters 
Indigenous characters (masks) from Ptuj wider area including Ptuj field, Drava field and from Haloze:

 "Kurent" or "Korant" (the main character)
 "The Whip Crackers" (for happines and well-being)
 "Carnival dancers" (from Pobrežje, Videm)
 "the Spearman" (marital character)
 "Ploughmen" (draw a magic circle)
 "Log-Haulers" (to enchant fertility)
 "The Devil" (fear, fear, is coming)
 "The Trough" (the straw bride)

 "Old Woman Carrying Her Man" (spirits of heaven)
 "The Mischievous Bear" (from Ptuj field)
 "Kurike and Piceki" (for a good harvest)
 "Jürek and Rabolj" (from Haloze)
 "Fairies" (Zabovci)
 "Rusas" (from Ptuj field)
 "Gypsis" (from Dornava)

Festival origins
The idea of an organized carnival event in Ptuj came about in the 1950s, when the carnival costumes, accompanied by a band, spontaneously formed processions on Shrove Tuesday. This event continued to grow, thanks in no small part to Ptuj cultural historian Drago Hasl (1900–1976). Hasl, an indefatigable organiser of Kurentovanje from its beginnings until the 1970s, was strongly convinced that this event could help prevent what he saw as the extremely rapid disappearance of carnival habits and traditional customs in surrounding villages. In 1959, Hasl, strongly backed by those who shared both his views and enthusiasm for the event, proposed that the Historical Society of Ptuj take over the organisation and the implementation of the carnival event. He suggested that the event should be named after the most well-known costumes Kurent – and Kurentovanje was born. Hasl prepared a draft regarding the content and outlining the major guidelines to be followed to transform Kurentovanje into an event of ethnographic significance. His vision of an event comprising the unique carnival figures and habits from the Ptuj region, which could be joined at a later stage by other traditional Slovene costumes, helped to make the event grow into a festival of costumes. He additionally planned to expand the content of the event by introducing contemporary carnival costumes.

Kurent or Korant - the main carnival figure
Kurent or Korant is the best-known traditional carnival figure of the entire region, as well as in all of Slovenia. The name is probably derived from the common noun kurant 'messenger, lackey, footman', borrowed from a Romance word from Latin currens 'running'—thus sharing a semantic base with the Cerkno term lavfar. While Kurent groups might not all look exactly the same, it is the most popular and frequent traditional carnival figure in the Ptuj and Drava plains, and in the Haloze Hills.

Kurent or Korant, as it is known today, has its origin in popular tradition. Traditionally, the Kurent'''s outfit was reserved for unmarried men, but nowadays Kurent-Korant can be unmarried or married men, as well as women, children, and animals.

The two types of Slovene Kurent-Korant are the so-called "feathery" (from the town of Markovci) and the "horned" ones (from Haloze), with the difference being mainly in the look of the head covering. The Kurent-Korant wears a massive sheepskin garment. Around its waist hangs a chain with huge bells attached—the resulting noise does a great job of "chasing away winter", which is, ostensibly, the Kurent's function. The Korent'' also wears heavy boots and special red or green leg warmers, while the head is covered by a towering furry hat festooned with ribbons, and a mask typically sporting a long, red tongue. A wooden club is normally carried in the left hand.

International carnival parade 
In 1960 and 1961, the event was held on Shrove Saturday. Since 1962, the event has been held on Shrove Sunday. Between 1962 and 1991, the program was scheduled in two parts: abefore noon there was parade of traditional costumes only in the city stadium, and the carnival was held in the town streets in the afternoon. With gathering of over 50,000 people each year on Sunday Shrove, this is the biggest Slovenian daily public event next to Planica Ski Flying event. 

1972 - only on stadium event, no city carnival.
1992 - no classic carnival, limited to four city squares only.

Traditional events

Introduction

Main events

Accompanying events

Princes of carnival 
First princ of the Kurentovanje carnival was inaugurated on 11 November 1999, as now became tradition. At the initiative of Branko Brumen, one of the main organisers of Kurentovanje and vice president of FECC, as he saw this folklore on other carnivals in Europe long before Ptuj. In 2000 first prince "took" mayor's office for the period of eleven days of Kurentovanje carnival. Since 2013 princes have two-year mandate.

Outside of Slovenia

Cleveland, Ohio, United States has one of the largest Slovenian American communities outside of Europe.  Centered around St. Vitus Church, the St. Clair–Superior neighborhood began hosting a local version of Kurentovanje in the 2013. The celebration is conducted on the Saturday prior to Ash Wednesday.

See also

Kukeri
Busójárás
Pre-Christian Alpine traditions
Zvončari
Koledari

References

External links 
 Kurentovanje
Kurentovanje in Ptuj
Description of Kurents
 Official Slovenia website - Kurenti tradition
 Photo gallery from Kurentovanje celebration
Cleveland Kurentovanje

Slovenian folklore
Cultural heritage of Slovenia
Slavic carnival
Intangible Cultural Heritage of Humanity